325th may refer to:

325th Air Division, an inactive United States Air Force unit
325th Division (Vietnam), a division of the People's Army of Vietnam
325th Fighter-Interceptor Squadron, an inactive United States Air Force unit
325th Fighter Wing, a wing of the United States Air Force
325th Air Control Squadron, former part of the 325th Fighter Wing
325th Infantry Division (Wehrmacht), infantry division of the German Heer, formed in March 1945 as one of the Wehrmacht's final emergency formations of the war
325th Infantry Regiment (United States), a light infantry parachute insertion fighting force of the United States Army
325th Weapons Squadron, a United States Air Force unit assigned to the USAF Weapons School

See also
325 (number)
325, the year 325 (CCCXXV) of the Julian calendar